Lola Dutronic Album 2 – The Love Parade, the second album by Canadian electronic music duo Lola Dutronic, was issued in 2007. "La Mer" is an adaptation from the song by Charles Trenet, and "Sukiyaki" is a remix of a song by Kyu Sakamoto. "Le Model" is an adaptation from the song "The Model / Das Modell" by Kraftwerk.

Track listing

2007 albums
Lola Dutronic albums
Bongo Beat Records albums